A Stein discrepancy is a statistical divergence between two probability measures that is rooted in Stein's method. It was first formulated as a tool to assess the quality of Markov chain Monte Carlo samplers, but has since been used in diverse settings in statistics, machine learning and computer science.

Definition 

Let  be a measurable space and let  be a set of measurable functions of the form .

 

The choice of the set  determines the topological properties of (1.1).

Stein's method is a theoretical tool that can be used to bound (1.1).

 

The operator  is termed a Stein operator and the set  is called a Stein set.  Substituting (1.2) into (1.1), we obtain an upper bound
 .
This resulting bound

 

is called a Stein discrepancy.  In contrast to the original integral probability metric , it may be possible to analyse or compute  using expectations only with respect to the distribution .

Examples 
Several different Stein discrepancies have been studied, with some of the most widely used presented next.

Classical Stein discrepancy 
For a probability distribution  with positive and differentiable density function  on a convex set , whose boundary is denoted , the combination of the Langevin–Stein operator  and the classical Stein set

 

yields the classical Stein discrepancy. Here  denotes the Euclidean norm and  the Euclidean inner product. If  then we interpret .

In the univariate case , the classical Stein discrepancy can be computed exactly by solving a quadratically constrained quadratic program.

Graph Stein discrepancy 
The first known computable Stein discrepancies were the graph Stein discrepancies (GSDs). Given a discrete distribution , one can define the graph  with vertex set  and edge set . From this graph, one can define the graph Stein set as
 
The combination of the Langevin–Stein operator and the graph Stein set is called the graph Stein discrepancy (GSD).

Kernel Stein discrepancy 

The supremum arising in the definition of Stein discrepancy can be evaluated in closed form using a particular choice of Stein set.  Indeed, let  be the unit ball in a (possibly vector-valued) reproducing kernel Hilbert space  with reproducing kernel , whose elements are in the domain of the Stein operator . Suppose that

 .

Then it can be shown that
,

 

A Stein discrepancy constructed in this manner is called a kernel Stein discrepancyLiu, Q., Lee, J. D., & Jordan, M. I. (2016). A kernelized Stein discrepancy for goodness-of-fit tests and model evaluation. International Conference on Machine Learning, 276–284. and the construction is closely connected to the theory of kernel embedding of probability distributions.

Let  be a reproducing kernel.

 

associated to the matrix-valued reproducing kernel , yields a kernel Stein discrepancy with

 

Concretely, if we take the inverse multi-quadric kernel  with parameters  and  a symmetric positive definite matrix, and if we denote , then we have

.

Diffusion Stein discrepancy 
Diffusion Stein discrepancies generalize the Langevin Stein operator  to a class of diffusion Stein operators , each representing an Itô diffusion that has  as its stationary distribution.
Here,  is a matrix-valued function determined by the infinitesimal generator of the diffusion.

Other Stein discrepancies 
Additional Stein discrepancies have been developed for constrained domains, non-Euclidean domains, discrete domains, improved scalability., and gradient-free Stein discrepancies where derivatives of the density  are circumvented.

Properties 
The flexibility in the choice of Stein operator and Stein set in the construction of Stein discrepancy precludes general statements of a theoretical nature.  However, much is known about the particular Stein discrepancies.

Computable without the normalisation constant 
Stein discrepancy can sometimes be computed in challenging settings where the probability distribution  admits a probability density function  (with respect to an appropriate reference measure on ) of the form , where  and its derivative can be numerically evaluated but whose normalisation constant  is not easily computed or approximated.

 

which does not depend on the normalisation constant .

Stein discrepancy as a statistical divergence 

A basic requirement of Stein discrepancy is that it is a statistical divergence, meaning that  and  if and only if .  This property can be shown to hold for classical Stein discrepancy and kernel Stein discrepancy a provided that appropriate regularity conditions hold.

Convergence control 

For the kernel Stein discrepancy, weak convergence control has been established under regularity conditions on the distribution  and the reproducing kernel , which are applicable in particular to (2.1).

Convergence detection 
For kernel Stein discrepancy, Wasserstein convergence detection has been established, under appropriate regularity conditions on the distribution  and the reproducing kernel .

Applications of Stein discrepancy 
Several applications of Stein discrepancy have been proposed, some of which are now described.

Optimal quantisation 

Stein points are the result of performing optimal quantisation via minimisation of Stein discrepancy:

Extensions of this result, to allow for imperfect numerical optimisation, have also been derived.

Sophisticated optimisation algorithms have been designed to perform efficient quantisation based on Stein discrepancy, including gradient flow algorithms that aim to minimise kernel Stein discrepancy over an appropriate space of probability measures.

Optimal weighted approximation 

If one is allowed to consider weighted combinations of point masses, then more accurate approximation is possible compared to (3.1).  For simplicity of exposition, suppose we are given a set of states .  Then the optimal weighted combination of the point masses , i.e.

which minimise Stein discrepancy can be obtained in closed form when a kernel Stein discrepancy is used. Some authors consider imposing, in addition, a non-negativity constraint on the weights, i.e. .  However, in both cases the computation required to compute the optimal weights  can involve solving linear systems of equations that are numerically ill-conditioned.  Interestingly, it has been shown that greedy approximation of  using an un-weighted combination of  states can reduce this computational requirement.  In particular, the greedy Stein thinning algorithm

has been shown to satisfy an error bound

 

Non-myopic and mini-batch generalisations of the greedy algorithm have been demonstrated to yield further improvement in approximation quality relative to computational cost.

Variational inference 

Stein discrepancy has been exploited as a variational objective in variational Bayesian methods.

 

Statistical estimation 

Stein discrepancy has been proposed as a tool to fit parametric statistical models to data. Given a dataset , consider the associated discrete distribution .

The approach is closely related to the framework of minimum distance estimation, with the role of the "distance" being played by the Stein discrepancy.

Hypothesis testing 

The Stein discrepancy has also been used as a test statistic for performing goodness-of-fit testing and comparing latent variable models.  
Since the aforementioned tests have a computational cost quadratic in the sample size, alternatives have been developed with (near-)linear runtimes.

See also 

 Stein's method
 Divergence (statistics)

References 

Statistical distance
Theory of probability distributions